The Arktika class is a Russian (formerly Soviet) class of nuclear-powered icebreakers. Formerly known as Project 10520 nuclear-powered icebreaker, they were the world's largest and most powerful icebreakers until the 2016 launch of the first Project 22220 icebreaker, also named Arktika. 

Ships of the Arktika class are owned by the federal government, but were operated by the Murmansk Shipping Company (MSCO) until 2008, when they were transferred to the fully state-owned corporation Atomflot. Of the ten civilian nuclear-powered vessels built by Russia or the Soviet Union, six were of this type. 

They are used for escorting merchant ships in the Arctic Ocean north of Siberia as well as for scientific and recreational expeditions to the Arctic.

History

On July 3, 1971, construction began on a conceptual design of a larger nuclear icebreaker, dubbed Arktika, in the Baltic Shipyard in then Leningrad. Four years later, on December 17, 1975, Moscow and Leningrad received radio messages informing them that sea trials had been completed successfully. The newest and largest nuclear icebreaker at the time was ready for the Arctic.

Arktika was the first surface ship to reach the North Pole, on August 17, 1977.

As the leading vessel in Russia's second nuclear icebreaker class, Arktika became the classification name for five icebreakers to follow: the Sibir in 1977, Rossiya in 1985, Sovetskiy Soyuz in 1989, the Yamal in 1992 and the 50 Let Pobedy in 2007.

The first of new class of nuclear icebreakers, Project 22220, was launched in 2016. Also called Arktika, it was launched in anticipation of decreasing ice and increased traffic.

Design and construction

OK-900A reactors

Over the period December 1967 to May 1970, Lenin, precursor of the Arktika and the first nuclear-propelled icebreaker, had its three OK-150 reactors, capable of 90 MW each, replaced with two OK-900 reactors, capable of 159 MW each. The work was carried out at the Zvezdochka yard in Severodvinsk.

Arktika and the entire Arktika-class icebreaker fleet are outfitted with two OK-900A reactors, which deliver 171 MW each. Each reactor is contained in its own closed compartment and weighs 160 tonnes. They are shielded by water, steel, and high density concrete, and ambient radiation is monitored throughout the ship by 86 sensors. The reactors were originally fueled by a 90% enriched, zirconium-clad, uranium fuel. Those reactors still in operation today now use a 20%-90% enriched with 60% average enrichment uranium dispersed in an aluminum matrix. The chain reaction can be stopped in 0.6 seconds by the full insertion of safety rods.
 
Arktika consumes up to 200 grams of fuel a day when breaking ice. There are 500 kg of uranium isotopes in each reactor, allowing for at least 13.7 years between changing reactor cores. The used cores are extracted and replaced in Murmansk, the spent fuel reprocessed and waste disposed of at a radioactive waste plant.

Propulsion
The OK-900A is a pressurized water reactor, meaning that cooling water is continually pumped under pressure through the reactor to remove heat, keeping the cores and the reactor cool. The heated water is pumped from the reactor to a boiler (four boilers per reactor), where it transfers its heat into another body of water, producing steam at a rate of 30 kgf/cm2 (2.94 MPa, or approximately 1,084 psi). Each set of four boilers drives two steam turbines, which turn three dynamos. One kilovolt of direct current is then delivered to three double-wound motors directly connected to the propeller, providing an average screw velocity of 120-180 rpm. Five auxiliary steam turbines are tied into the plant to provide electricity, turning generators with a cumulative electric power of 10 MW.

Three fixed-pitch propellers provide Arktika with its thrust, power, and maneuverability. The starboard and centerline propellers turn clockwise while the port turns counter clockwise to compensate. Each propeller sits at the end of a 20-meter (65.6 ft) shaft and has four blades, which weigh seven tons and are attached by nine bolts to the hub which is 5.7 meters (18.7 ft) in diameter and weighs 50 tonnes. Arktika also carries four spare blades along with the appropriate diving equipment and tools so that propeller repairs may be made at sea; the operation can take anywhere from one to four days depending on the extent of the damage.

The propellers can deliver a combined bollard pull of 480 tons with 18-43 MW (25,000 shaft horsepower) [totals: 55.3 MW (75,000 shp)].

Ships

See also
Taymyr (1987 icebreaker)
Vaygach (1989 icebreaker)

References

External links
 Nuclear Powered Icebreakers , Bellona Foundation
 Technical information, MSCO
 Russia scraps another nuclear-powered icebreaker, Barents Observer
 The Yamal, a nuclear powered Icebreaker page, Cool Antarctica

Icebreakers of the Soviet Union
Icebreakers of Russia
Nuclear-powered icebreakers
Soviet inventions
Auxiliary icebreaker classes